Samuel Perry (born October 30, 1969) is Associate Professor of East Asian Studies at Brown University. Having grown up on the East Side of Providence, RI, and attended Moses Brown and Classical High School, he went on to study at Brown University and the University of Chicago. Now a specialist on Japanese and Korean history, culture and literature, he is the author of several books on leftist cultures of activism around the globe, including Recasting Red Culture in Proletarian Japan: Childhood, Korea, and the Historical Avant-garde. He is also the translator of Kang Kyŏng-ae 강경애's novel From Wŏnso Pond as well as a collection of stories Five Faces of Feminism by Ineko Sata 佐多稲子, aided by a 2013 National Endowment for the Arts Translation Fellowship.

Perry's latest book, an anthology of Queer Korean literature, will be published by the Modern Language Association later this year in both Korean and English under the title "A Century of Queer Korean Literature". Another forthcoming book manuscript is a cultural history of the Korean War in Japan, a book he began writing in 2016 while on an ACLS Fellowship at CRASSH at the University of Cambridge.

According to his Brown University webpage, Perry is "interested in the role culture plays in political change"; his academic work "aligns itself with a body of scholarship that has reassessed activist formations around the world, and seeks to understand the strategies by which marginalized people have contested dominant cultures."

Life
Perry is the son of a former Rhode Island College Professor of Sociology, Donald Perry, and long-time Rhode Island State Senator, Rhoda Perry. He graduated with an AB from Brown University in 1991 and a PhD from the University of Chicago in 2007. He spent a year as a postdoctoral fellow at Harvard University. He also attended universities in Japan, South Korea and Germany, and was for several years a high school teacher at Phillips Exeter Academy in Exeter, NH.

Translations
 KIM Chŏnghan, "Letters from Okinawa" (오키나와에서 편지, 1977), in Ruth Baraclough, Jin-kyung Lee, and Lee Sang-kyung, ed., Island Ablaze: North and South Korean Stories about the US Empire. (Ithaca, NY: Cornell East Asian Series, 2021).
 YANG Sŏgil, "In Shinjuku" (新宿にて, 1978), in John Lie, ed., Zainichi Literature: Japanese Writings by Ethnic Koreans. (Berkeley, CA: Institute of East Asian Studies, 2019).
 CHANG Hyŏk-chu, “Hell of the Starving” (餓鬼道, 1932), in Heather Bowen-Struyk and Norma Field, eds. Literature for Revolution: An Anthology of Japanese Proletarian Writings. (Chicago, IL: University of Chicago Press, 2017).
 KOBAYASHI Takiji, "Letter" (テガミ, 1931), (and other works of 'wall fiction' (壁小説)) in Heather Bowen-Struyk and Norma Field, eds. Literature for Revolution: An Anthology of Japanese Proletarian Writings. (Chicago, University of Chicago Press, 2017).
 SATA Ineko, Five Faces of Japanese Feminism: Crimson and Other Works. Translated and introduced by Samuel Perry. (Honolulu, HI: University of Hawai`i Press, 2016).
 KANG Kyŏng-ae, From Wŏnso Pond 인간문제. Translated and introduced by Samuel Perry. (New York, NY: The Feminist Press, 2009). 
 SONG Yŏng, "The Blast Furnace". In Theodore Hughes, Sang-Kyung Lee, Jae-Yong Kim & Jin-kyung Lee, eds., Rat Fire: Korean Stories from the Japanese Empire (Ithaca, NY: Cornell East Asia Series, 2014). 
 SATA Ineko, "White and Purple" (白と紫, 1950)  Translator's Introduction to "White and Purple"

References

External links
 Samuel Perry Brown University Professor, East Asian Studies
 NEA Writers Corner: Samuel Perry
 The Feminist Press: Samuel Perry

Brown University faculty
National Endowment for the Arts Fellows
Brown University alumni
1969 births
Living people